The Ghana Secondary Technical School is a science and technology-oriented high school located in Takoradi on the west coast of Ghana. It is the third oldest high school in Ghana - the oldest 'non-missionary' high school. The School was founded on 9 August 1909 in Accra as Accra Technical School and later changed to Government Technical School. It moved to its current site in Takoradi in 1939. In 1953, the name was changed to Government Secondary Technical School, and in 1970, it was given its current name. Former students of the school are known as Giants, and students in the school are called Tescans.

History
The school was started in 1909 as a pure Technical School and was then sited at the former premises of the Accountant General (the current site of Kinbu Secondary Technical School in Accra). It was founded in response to the growing demand for technical education in the British colonies at that time.

In 1939, the school was moved to Takoradi. The first head was Mr. T. T. Gilbert. The first African head was Mr. J.W.L. Mills, who took up his post in 1958. A sixth-form was introduced in 1961.

The school's name changed from Government Secondary Technical School to Ghana Secondary Technical School in 1970.

For a brief period in the mid-nineteen-seventies students were admitted as part of military training. This started with Intake 15 of the then Military Academy and Training Schools. They underwent a combination of regular academic work with intermittent military training during holidays.

List of principals and headmasters

School Anthem
GSTS ANTHEM – By Gt Stephen Agyefi Mensah 1996

Verse 1:

Honor O God, our leaders great

To whom you gave wisdom and power

To build this Glorious institute

Chorus:

So grant us, Lord Divine

Hope, Strength and Love

To Cherish and Uphold G.S.TS

Verse 2:

With zeal they toiled with hands and brains

And serve faithfully with their might

Their dear nation and made their mark

Chorus:

So grant us, Lord Divine

Hope, Strength and Love

To Cherish and Uphold G.S.TS

Verse 3:

Great is the duty we still owe

With full commitment and hard work

To strive and shirk not our duty

Chorus 2x:

So grant us, Lord Divine

Hope, Strength and Love

To Cherish and Uphold G.S.T.S

Achievements
 Winners of the 2012 National Science and Maths Quiz Competition(And two times runner up)
 Winners of the 62nd Independence Quiz Competition
2014 best WASSCE student was a Tescan.
In 11 June 2018, 14 students from Ghana Secondary Technical School (GSTS) Takoradi represented Ghana Genius Olympiad  hosted at Suny Oswego University in New York City, United States of America (USA) started from June 11 to 18, 2018.

Sports 
 Winners of the Aggrey Shield in 1957 in Kumasi.
 2009 National basketball champions at the National Milo Schools' Sports Festival in Kumasi.
.
 Winners of zonal inter school athletics competition with close to 40 titles since the inception of the competition (regional record holder in highest number of wins).
 Soccer champions in Takoradi Zonal Inter School competition on more than seven occasions.* Winners of the 2015 Edition of the Osagyefo Cup.

Extra curricular activities 
 First school in the Gold Coast to establish a cadet corps (in 1954).

Notable alumni
Academics
Kwesi Akwansah Andam, Vice Chancellor of Kwame Nkrumah University of Science and Technology
Ebenezer Oduro Owusu, Vice Chancellor of University of Ghana
Agyeman Badu Akosa, professor of Pathology, former Director of Ghana Health Service, politician and social commentator
Science and technology
Ashitey Trebi-Ollennu, aerospace engineer at NASA
Sports
Augustine Ahinful – Football player
Politics and governance
Fred Ohene-Kena – former Minister for Mines and Energy.
Mike Hammah - Former NDC Member of Parliament for Winneba (Effutu Constituency)
Nana Akomea (New Patriotic Party)
Hon. Alfred Ekow Gyan – politician, former Deputy Western Regional Minister
William Agyapong Quaitoo – Member of Parliament for Akim Oda Constituency, former Deputy Minister for Agriculture
Francis Edward Techie-Menson – politician, member of parliament and minister of state during the first republic
Richard Quarshigah – politician, member of parliament and minister of state
Military
Joseph Narh Adinkra -former Chief of Army Staff
Stephen Obimpeh – former Chief of Naval Staff of the Ghana Navy, former minister of state.  
Matthew Quashie – former Chief of Defence Staff of the Ghana Armed Forces
Peter Kofi Faidoo – chief of naval staff
Others
Odeneho Gyapong Ababio II 
K.Y. Amoako
Augustine Ahinful

References

Boys' schools in Ghana
Educational institutions established in 1909
Schools in Ghana
Sekondi-Takoradi
1909 establishments in Gold Coast (British colony)
High schools in Ghana
Education in the Western Region (Ghana)